Anand Amritraj and Vijay Amritraj were the defending champions but lost in the second round to Bob Hewitt and Frew McMillan.

Hewitt and McMillan won the doubles title at the 1978 Queen's Club Championships tennis tournament defeating Fred McNair and Raúl Ramírez in the final 6–2, 7–5.

Seeds

Draw

Final

Top half

Bottom half

References

External links
Official website Queen's Club Championships 
ATP tournament profile

Doubles